Mitch Irwin (born July 8, 1952) is a former Democratic member of the Michigan Senate, serving from 1979 through 1990, and was director of two state executive departments under former Governor Jennifer M. Granholm.

Irwin was a member of the Michigan 4-H Board of Trustees and the Michigan Aviation Hall of Fame Board of Trustees.

He was an unsuccessful candidate for the Michigan House of Representatives in 1976, and for Congress in 1988.

References

1952 births
Living people
People from Sault Ste. Marie, Michigan
State cabinet secretaries of Michigan
Democratic Party Michigan state senators
20th-century American politicians
21st-century American politicians